The Coalition of Immokalee Workers (CIW) is a worker-based human rights organization based in Immokalee, Florida, which focuses on the fields of social responsibility, human trafficking, and gender-based violence at work. Built on a foundation of farmworker community organizing starting in 1993, and reinforced with the creation of a national consumer network since 2000, CIW's work has steadily grown over more than twenty years to encompass several overlapping spheres:

The CIW has aided in the investigation and federal prosecution of several slavery operations in Floridian agriculture. CIW received the 2015 Presidential Medal for Extraordinary Efforts to Combat Human Trafficking in Persons for "pioneering the Fair Food Program, empowering agricultural workers, and leveraging market forces and consumer awareness to promote supply chain transparency and eradicate modern slavery on participating farms."  Previously, the U.S. Department of State presented the CIW with a 2010 Hero Acting to End Modern-Day Slavery Award and credited the CIW for developing "a multi-sectoral approach, tapping NGOs, law enforcement, labor inspectors and the survivors, themselves" to combat forced labor in the U.S. agriculture industry.

The CIW's national Campaign for Fair Food educates consumers on the issue of farm labor exploitation – its causes and solutions – and forges alliances between farmworkers and consumers that enlist the market power of major corporate buyers to help end that exploitation.  The CIW's Campaign for Fair Food has secured agreements with fourteen major food retailers, including Yum! Brands, McDonald's, Compass Group, and Walmart. In 2010, the campaign resulted in the creation of the Fair Food Program (FFP), following an historic agreement between the CIW and the Florida Tomato Growers Exchange to implement the "Fair Food Code of Conduct" on 90% of the state's tomato farms, affecting approximately 30,000 acres of production and tens of thousands of workers.

Early history

The CIW, initially called the Southwest Florida Farmworker Project, was formed in 1993 in Immokalee (I-m-u-k-a-l-i), Florida, a center of the state's $600 million tomato industry. The group's organizing philosophy is based on principles of popular education and leadership development. One of the CIW's first accomplishments was to establish a cooperative to sell staple foods and other necessities at cost in order to combat price gouging by local merchants. Today, the CIW also owns and operates WCIW-LP (107.7 FM, "Radio Conciencia"), a low-power FM radio station that features music, news, and educational programing in several languages.

Between 1995 and 2000, the CIW organized several major actions to protest declining real wages for tomato harvesters, as well as frequent violence from supervisors towards field workers. This period included community-wide work stoppages in 1995, 1997 and 1999; a 30-day hunger strike undertaken by six members in 1998; and a 230-mile march from Ft. Myers to Orlando in 2000. By 1998, these protests "won industry-wide raises of 13-25% (translating into several million dollars annually for the community in increased wages).... Those raises brought the tomato picking piece rate back to pre-1980 levels (the piece rate had fallen below those levels over the course of the intervening two decades), but wages remained below poverty level and continuing improvement was slow in coming."

Campaign for Fair Food

Timeline

Fast food
The CIW launched a boycott of Taco Bell in 2001, holding the company accountable for the wages and working conditions of farmworkers in its tomato supply chain. The CIW argued that when major buyers such as Taco Bell leverage their volume purchasing power to demand discounts from their suppliers, they create strong downward pressure on wages and working conditions in these suppliers' operations. A 2004 study by Oxfam America confirmed this trend: "Squeezed by the buyers of their produce, growers pass on the costs and risks imposed on them to those on the lowest rung of the supply chain: the farmworkers they employ."

During the Taco Bell Boycott, the CIW worked closely with religious and community groups and a student network, the Student/Farmworker Alliance, to pressure Taco Bell from different angles. On March 8, 2005, Yum! Brands, Inc., parent company of Taco Bell, agreed to all of the CIW's demands, including:
The first-ever direct, ongoing payment by a fast-food industry leader to farmworkers in its supply chain to address sub-standard farm labor wages (nearly doubling the percentage of the final retail price that goes to the workers who pick the produce);
The first-ever enforceable Code of Conduct for agricultural suppliers in the fast-food industry (which includes the CIW as part of the investigative body for monitoring worker complaints);
Market incentives for agricultural suppliers willing to respect their workers’ human rights, even when those rights are not guaranteed by law;
100% transparency for Taco Bell's tomato purchases in Florida.

After the Taco Bell Boycott, the Campaign for Fair Food shifted its focus to the rest of the fast-food industry. In response to the campaign, McDonald's helped create an industry-controlled code of conduct known as SAFE (Socially Accountable Farm Employers) that the CIW and its allies deemed insufficient. On April 9, 2007, an agreement between McDonald's and the CIW was announced at the Carter Center in Atlanta, Georgia. The agreement, which met the standards previously set by the Taco Bell accord, also included a commitment by McDonald's to work with the CIW to develop an industry-wide third-party mechanism to monitor conditions and investigate abuses in the fields.

In May 2008, at the U.S. Capitol, the CIW announced an agreement with Burger King. The world's second-largest burger chain had originally strongly opposed the campaign, even going so far as to hire a private investigative firm to provide information on the Student/Farmworker Alliance. As part of the announcement, Burger King's chief executive, John W. Chidsey, apologized for prior negative remarks directed towards the CIW and went on to praise the group's efforts. Subway, the largest fast-food buyer of Florida tomatoes, signed an agreement with the CIW six months later in December 2008. With this agreement, four of the world's largest fast-food companies were now supporting the campaign. The CIW and  Chipotle Mexican Grill reached a Fair Food Agreement on October 4, 2012, after a six-year campaign by the CIW.

The Campaign for Fair Food is currently focused on Wendy's, in addition to several supermarket chains listed below. In November 2017, the Center for Union Facts filed a complaint with the Internal Revenue Service asserting the CIW "does not serve the public at large but instead a group of workers seeking concessions from their employers." The union watchdog requested that "the IRS examine CIW's Forms 990 for 2013, 2014, and 2015, and, if appropriate, revoke its tax-exempt status."

Foodservice
Throughout 2009 and 2010, the Student/Farmworker Alliance's "Dine with Dignity" campaign targeted the foodservice industry since many of these companies operate on college campuses. During this period, the CIW reached agreements with Bon Appétit Management Company, Compass Group, Aramark, and Sodexo.

Supermarkets
In September 2008, the CIW broke ground in the supermarket industry by signing an agreement with Whole Foods Market. Karen Christensen, a Whole Foods executive explained, "We commend the CIW for their advocacy on behalf of these workers. After carefully evaluating the situation in Florida, we felt that an agreement of this nature was in line with our core values and was in the best interest of the workers." The Whole Foods agreement marked the first time a retailer agreed to support the CIW initiative without extended public protests.

In February 2012, the CIW and Trader Joe's "signed an agreement that formalizes the ways in which Trader Joe's will work with the CIW and Florida tomato growers to support the CIW's Fair Food Program." This was the first Fair Food agreement the CIW signed with a major food retailer in the aftermath of the 2010 breakthrough settlement with the Florida Tomato Growers Exchange.

In January 2014, Walmart, the largest grocery retailer in the U.S., announced it was joining the Fair Food Program. In its agreement with the CIW, Walmart committed to help expand the Fair Food Program outside of Florida and into crops other than tomatoes. Alexandra Guáqueta, chair of the UN Working Group on Business and Human Rights, attended the signing ceremony and conveyed a statement on behalf of the Working Group.  The statement praises the Fair Food Program for its "smart mix" of monitoring and enforcement tools, including "market incentives for growers and retailers, monitoring policies and, crucially, a robust and accessible mechanism to resolve complaints and provide remedy," adding, "Workers have no fear of retaliation if they identify problems."  The statement concludes, "We are eager to see whether the Fair Food Program is able to leverage further change within participating businesses, and serve as a model elsewhere in the world."

In 2015, the CIW signed Fair Food Agreements with The Fresh Market. and Ahold (parent company of Giant and Stop & Shop).

The CIW and its allies are focused on the supermarket industry leaders who remain uncommitted to the Fair Food Program, including Publix and Kroger.

Florida Tomato Growers Exchange

In November 2007, the Florida Tomato Growers Exchange (FTGE), an agricultural cooperative that provides its grower members with limited antitrust protection for marketing their products, announced that the Taco Bell/Yum and McDonald's deals "will not be executed and now are considered moot." Citing antitrust concerns, the FTGE threatened its members with $100,000 fines for cooperating with McDonald's or Yum Brands. One month later, FTGE Vice President Reggie Brown explained, "I think it is un-American when you get people outside your business to dictate terms of business to you."  As a result of the FTGE's resistance, the penny-per-pound funds accrued during the stalemate were held in escrow.

On April 15, 2008, the United States Senate Committee on Health, Education, Labor, and Pensions (HELP) held hearings on "Ending Abuses and Improving Working Conditions for Tomato Workers" in which Reggie Brown claimed farmworkers earned an average wage of "between $10.50 and $14.86 per hour." Lucas Benitez of the CIW and Senators Bernie Sanders (VT-I) and Dick Durbin (IL-D) disputed Brown's claim by citing contradictory evidence. The senators also scrutinized the legal basis for the FTGE's resistance to the Campaign for Fair Food.

Expansion
During Summer 2015, the Fair Food Program expanded to large operations of Florida-based tomato growers in Georgia, South Carolina, North Carolina, Virginia, Maryland, and New Jersey. The Fair Food Program is also expanding into strawberries and green bell peppers in Florida.

Fair Food Program
In November 2010, an agreement was reached between the CIW and the Florida Tomato Growers Exchange to implement the Fair Food Program – "including a strict code of conduct, a cooperative complaint resolution system, a participatory health and safety program, and a worker-to-worker education process – to over 90% of the Florida tomato industry.". The agreement covers more than 30,000 workers and 30,000 acres of production. Workers could receive an increase in annual wages from $10,000-12,000 a year to $17,000 if additional large buyers agree to the increase. In an editorial, the New York Times described the agreement as a "remarkable victory in a 15-year struggle for better pay and working conditions... The Immokalee victory won’t impose fairness overnight, but after generations of exploitation, part of the farm industry is pointing in the right direction."

The Fair Food Program is monitored by the Fair Food Standards Council, a non-profit organization based in Sarasota, Florida. The FFSC is directed by a former New York State Supreme Court Justice.

The Fair Food Program has received praise from numerous observers, including:

The Roosevelt Institute awarded the CIW its 2013 Freedom from Want Medal (a Four Freedoms Award), in recognition of the Fair Food Program as "a sustainable blueprint for worker-driven corporate social responsibility, winning fairer wages; work with dignity; and freedom from forced labor, sexual harassment, and violence in the workplace" 
President Jimmy Carter echoed this conclusion in a public letter to the CIW from July 2013, stating, "You have formed innovative partnerships to find common ground between diverse interests, including some of the poorest workers in the United States and their employers, supply chain companies, retailers, consumers and law enforcement. My hope is that this will become a model for social responsibility within the agricultural industry."
After a year-long investigation of sexual assault in the fields from California to Florida, a PBS Frontline producer declared the Fair Food Program to be the single most effective prevention program in the U.S. agricultural industry.
A delegation from the United Nations Working Group on Business and Human Rights toured the U.S. on a mission to "explore practices, challenges and lessons relating to efforts on implementing" the United Nations Guiding Principles on Business and Human Rights. The delegation visited with several Fair Food Program stakeholders as part of its broader investigation. While the Working Group found numerous shortcomings in the response of U.S. businesses generally to human rights issues, it left "impressed" with the Fair Food Program specifically, praising the FFP for "innovatively address[ing] core worker concerns" and "governance gaps relating to labour issues" through "market incentives for participating growers" and an "independent and robust enforcement mechanism."
The White House Office of Faith-Based and Neighborhood Partnerships singled out the Fair Food Program in a major 2013 report as one of the "most successful and innovative programs" in the world today to uncover and prevent modern-day slavery.

The Fair Food Program was the subject of a feature-length, front-page article in The New York Times on April 24, 2014. In this article Janice Fine, a labor relations professor at Rutgers University stated, ""This is the best workplace-monitoring program I’ve seen in the U.S.... It can certainly be a model for agriculture across the U.S. If anybody is going to lead the way and teach people how it’s done, it’s them." In the same article, Susan Marquis, dean of the Pardee Rand Graduate School commented on the FFP's effectiveness, noting, "When I first visited Immokalee, I heard appalling stories of abuse and modern slavery... But now the tomato fields in Immokalee are probably the best working environment in American agriculture. In the past three years, they’ve gone from being the worst to the best." The CIW recently released its 2021 Fair Food Program report, which includes updated statistics regarding the impact of the program along with education and training for farmworkers to use at their jobs.

Anti-Slavery Campaign

The CIW has developed an internationally recognized "worker-based approach to eliminating modern-day slavery in the agricultural industry. The CIW helps fight this crime by uncovering, investigating, and assisting in the federal prosecution of slavery rings preying on hundreds of farmworkers. In such situations, captive workers are held against their will by their employers through threats and, all too often, the actual use of violence – including beatings, shootings, and pistol-whippings."

The CIW is a founding member of the national Freedom Network U.S.A to Empower Victims of Slavery and Trafficking. Additionally, the CIW is a regional coordinator for the Freedom Network Training Institute on Human Trafficking (FNTI). In this capacity, the CIW trains state and federal law enforcement and NGOs on how to identify and assist people held in slavery operations.

Other selected anti-slavery partnerships and collaborations include

Legislature-appointed member, Florida Statewide Task Force on Human Trafficking
Florida Dept. of Law Enforcement (FDLE), curriculum for Advanced Investigative Techniques in Human Trafficking
Collier County Sheriff's Department Anti-Trafficking Unit
US Attorney's Anti-Trafficking Task Forces, Tampa and Miami districts
Federal Bureau of Investigation (F.B.I), Supervisory Special Agents In-Service trainings
North Carolina State Troopers Training Academy, training
U.S. Department of Justice, Civil Rights Division, Anti-Trafficking Unit, Washington, DC

In 2010, the CIW developed a mobile Florida Modern-Day Slavery Museum that has extensively toured the southern and eastern U.S. The Village Voice wrote that the museum "may be Florida's most important new attraction."

Awards and recognition

The CIW has received a wide array of honors and recognition, including:

2006 - Paul and Sheila Wellstone Award, Freedom Network USA, for outstanding contributions to combating human trafficking and modern-day slavery in the U.S.
2007 - Anti-Slavery Award, Anti-Slavery International of London (world's oldest human rights organization) for exceptional contribution towards tackling modern-day slavery in the U.S. agricultural industry.
2008 - Sister Margaret Cafferty Development of People Award, Catholic Campaign for Human Development.
2010 - Adela Dwyer-St. Thomas of Villanova Peace Award, Villanova University, Center for Peace & Justice Education.
2010 - People of the Year, Fort Myers (FL) News-Press, in recognition of the CIW's "years of groundbreaking advocacy" and "landmark efforts, which have far-ranging implications beyond Southwest Florida."
2010 - Hero Acting to End Modern-Day Slavery Award, U.S. Department of State. On the occasion of the State Department's release of the 10th annual Trafficking in Persons (TIP) report, which for the first time included the United States in its rankings. In recognition of "perseverance against slavery operations in the U.S. agricultural industry" and "determination to eliminate forced labor in supply chains."
2012 - Growing Green Award, Natural Resources Defense Council, for leaders and innovators in the field of sustainable food and agriculture.
2013 - Freedom from Want Medal, Roosevelt Institute, in recognition of creating "a sustainable blueprint for worker-driven corporate social responsibility, winning fairer wages; work with dignity; and freedom from forced labor, sexual harassment, and violence in the workplace" 
2014 - Clinton Global Citizen Award, Clinton Global Initiative, in recognition of the Fair Food Program as "a breakthrough, worker-driven approach to verifiable corporate accountability recognized by the United Nations and the White House for its unique effectiveness."
2015 - Presidential Medal for Extraordinary Efforts to Combat Human Trafficking in Persons, "by pioneering the Fair Food Program, empowering agricultural workers, and leveraging market forces and consumer awareness to promote supply chain transparency and eradicate modern slavery on participating farms."
2017 - MacArthur Genius Fellowship awarded to CIW Co-Founder, Greg Asbed, for pioneering a “visionary strategy… with potential to transform workplace environments across the global supply chain”
2018 - ALBA/Puffin Award for Human Rights Activism from the Puffin Foundation and the Abraham Lincoln Brigades Archives. "In support of their continued efforts to protect the rights of agricultural workers, prevent involuntary servitude, and create a food supply chain that is fair from bottom to top."

See also
Food Chains, a 2014 documentary about the Coalition of Immokalee Workers.

References

Further reading
 Bales, Kevin and Ron Soodalter. The Slave Next Door: Human Trafficking and Slavery in America Today. University of California Press, 2009.
 Bowe, John. Nobodies: Modern American Slave Labor and the Dark Side of the New Global Economy. Random House, 2007.
 Estabrook, Barry. Tomatoland. Andrews McMeel, 2011.

External links
 Coalition of Immokalee Workers website
 Alliance for Fair Food website
 Fair Food Program website
 Fair Food Standards Council website

Agricultural labor in the United States

Caribbean-American organizations
Community organizations
Haitian-American culture in Florida
Hispanic and Latino American culture in Florida
Hispanic and Latino American organizations
Human trafficking in the United States
Maya diaspora
Workers' rights organizations based in the United States
Organizations established in 1993
Non-profit organizations based in Florida
Social movements in the United States
Tomatoes
Recipients of the Four Freedoms Award
1993 establishments in Florida
Robert F. Kennedy Human Rights Award laureates